Truth Be Told is the fourth studio album by the British rock band Shed Seven, released via Artful Records in May 2001. Initial copies of the album featured a limited edition bonus disc with additional CD-ROM material along with an exclusive bonus track.

Background
The album is the first to feature original guitarist, Joe Johnson, who left the band in 1993 before the release of their debut album, Change Giver. He had been replaced by new guitarist Paul Banks, who left the band in December 1999 prior to the band re-recruiting Johnson to fill the void.

Track listing
All tracks written by Johnson/Smith/Witter.

Track 11 is an alternate version to the one included on the Step Inside Your Love EP issued in October 2001.

Personnel

Shed Seven
Rick Witter – lead vocals
Tom Gladwin – bass
Alan Leach – drums
Joe Johnson – guitar
Fraser Smith – keyboards, backing vocals, string arrangement

Additional musicians
Vince Parsonage – string arrangement, viola
Tamsin Symmons – violin
Sally Ladds – cello
James Lancaster – brass

Technical personnel
Shed Seven – producer, arranger
Adi Winman – producer
Will Bartle – assistant engineer
Chris Sheldon – executive producer, mixing
Adam Nunn – mastering
Tom Howard – band photography
thelongdrop – art direction, photography

References

External links

Truth Be Told at YouTube (streamed copy where licensed)

Shed Seven albums
2001 albums